The Civil Code of Spain, formally the Royal Decree of 24 July 1889 is the law that regulates the major aspects of Spanish civil law. It is one of the last civil codes in Continental Europe because of the sociopolitical, religious and territorial tensions that dominated 19th-century Spain. The code has been modified numerous times and remains in force.

Structure
The structure of the Civil Code is heavily inspired by the French Civil Code of 1804. It is made up of 1976 articles.
 Preliminary Title. Of legal norms, their application and efficacy (articles 1 to 16).
 Book I. Of persons (articles 17 to 332).
 Book II. Of goods, of property and of their modifications (articles 333 to 608).
 Book III. Of the different ways of acquiring property (articles 609 to 1087).
 Book IV. Of obligations and contracts (articles 1088 to 1975).
 Article 1976 is a repeal provision.
 13 transitional provisions.
 4 additional provisions.

See also
 Civil law (legal system)
 Civil code

External links
 Código Civil - BOE.es (in Spanish)

Law of Spain
Spain